The 1970 European Cup Winners' Cup Final was a football match between Manchester City of England and Górnik Zabrze of Poland on 29 April 1970 at Praterstadion in Vienna, Austria. It was the final match of the 1969–70 European Cup Winners' Cup and the tenth European Cup Winners' Cup final. Both sides made their first appearance in a European final. Manchester City won the match 2–1 thanks to goals by Neil Young and Francis Lee. It was the lowest ever attendance for the final of a European competition. The game wasn't televised live in the UK due to a clash with the 1970 FA cup final replay.

Route to the final

Manchester City and Górnik Zabrze qualified for the Cup Winners' Cup by winning their respective national cups in the 1968–69 season. Manchester City defeated Leicester City in the 1969 FA Cup Final, while Górnik defeated Legia Warsaw 2–0 in the 1969 Polish Cup Final.

Manchester City
It was only second Manchester City's European campaign. Their maiden entry into European competition, an appearance in the 1968–69 European Cup, saw the club exit in the opening round. 

Manchester City played the away leg first in every round. Their first tie was against Spanish club Athletic Bilbao, who were themselves managed by an Englishman, Ronnie Allen. In the first leg, City recovered from a two-goal deficit to secure a 3–3 draw. The home leg was a routine 3–0 win. Post-match reports alleged that a scuffle had taken place at half-time between Mike Doyle and José Ramón Betzuen, The referee spoke to both managers, but did not take any further action.

Górnik Zabrze
The 1969–70 cup run was Górnik's seventh European campaign. The club had participated in the European Cup six times in the previous decade. It was their first appearance in the Cup Winners' Cup. The club had qualified for the competition on one previous occasion, but withdrew without playing a match.

Match

Summary
Manchester City were without winger Mike Summerbee with a leg injury that had troubled him since the League Cup Final the previous month. George Heslop came into the team as a result, though Summerbee was fit enough to be named as a substitute. Heslop was given the task of man-marking Włodzimierz Lubański, who The Guardian identified as "an outstanding individual... ...whom Malcolm Allison considers to be in the same class as Eusébio."

Manchester City started strongly, particularly Francis Lee; The Guardian correspondent wrote "Lee, indefatigable and nigh irresistible continually embarrassed the Górnik defence in the early stages". Lee had the first chance of the match, a close range shot which was saved by Kostka. Manchester City took the lead in the 12th minute. Lee cut in from the left wing, escaping a tackle from Alfred Olek, and struck a fierce shot. Goalkeeper Hubert Kostka parried the ball, only for it to land at the feet of Neil Young for a simple finish. Shortly after City defender Mike Doyle sustained an ankle injury after colliding with Stefan Florenski. Manchester City played on with ten men for a period as Doyle received treatment from trainer Dave Ewing, but the defender was unable to continue. Substitute Ian Bowyer replaced him. The change prompted an alteration in formation, in which Colin Bell switched to a deeper position.  Shortly before half-time, Young won the ball after loose play from Florenski, which put him clear on goal. As Young moved into the penalty area Kostka rushed out of his goal and upended him, leaving the referee no option but to give a penalty. Lee struck the spot-kick with power into the centre of the goal. Kostka's legs made contact with the ball, but the force of the shot carried it into the net to make it 2–0. Górnik got a goal back midway through the second half, but there were no more goals and the match finished 2–1.

Details

Post-match
Winning manager Joe Mercer said "the heavy rain in the second half ruined the game" and that he was "quite happy with the performance of our team, although the technical level was rather low in the second half". Górnik manager Michał Matyas blamed his side's poor start, saying the "first goal came too early for us and we never recovered from this shock."

See also
1970 European Cup Final
1970 Inter-Cities Fairs Cup Final
Manchester City F.C. in European football

References

Bibliography

External links
UEFA Cup Winners' Cup results at Rec.Sport.Soccer Statistics Foundation
1970 European Cup Winners' Cup Final at UEFA.com
Match report

3
Cup Winners' Cup Final 1970
Cup Winners' Cup Final 1970
1970
UEFA Cup Winners' Cup Finals
Euro
Euro
Euro
April 1970 sports events in Europe
1970s in Vienna
Sports competitions in Vienna